This is a list of public art in Monmouthshire. This list applies only to works of public art on permanent display in an outdoor public space. For example, this does not include artworks in museums.

Abergavenny

Caldicot

Chepstow

Magor

Monmouth

Usk

References

External links 
 Public art in Newport, Newport City Council

Monmouthshire
Monmouthshire